"The Hidden Enemy" is the sixteenth episode of the first season of the American animated television series Star Wars: The Clone Wars. It originally aired on February 6, 2009 on Cartoon Network.

The episode was directed by Steward Lee and written by Drew Z. Greenberg.

In its original broadcast, "The Hidden Enemy" was watched by 2.51 million people. The episode received positive reviews from television critics.

Plot
Anakin and Obi-Wan lead Republic forces in an attempt to defeat the droid armies and free the planet of Christophsis from the Separatist siege. When the Republic is ambushed and forced to retreat, it becomes clear that someone in their midst has set them up. The Jedi believe this infiltration is a Sith-backed operation and go behind enemy lines to investigate. Meanwhile, Captain Rex and Commander Cody set out to uncover the traitor amongst them. While they at first suspect Chopper to be the traitor, a slip by Slick during the interrogation reveals him to be the traitor. In the subsequent chase Slick takes out the weapon arsenal, but manage to find him in the command center, where they confront him. He reveals his motive to be freedom from always following orders. In the meantime the Jedi return to Christophsis, where they encounter Ventress, whom they are fighting. Ventress eventually lures Anakin and Obi-Wan into an ambush, which they manage to escape.

Production

"The Hidden Enemy" was directed by Steward Lee and written by Drew Z. Greenberg, with Brian Larsen as staff writer. The production code of the episode was 2.01.

Regarding the plot of the episode, Lee said "I thought it was interesting because the clone's logic is understandable", adding "he no longer wants to be just a slave to the Jedi, and wants to try and break that infrastructure. He thinks he's doing the right thing for all the clones and that the sacrifice is worth it". Lee also said that the episode created "an interesting beginning of something to come", and questioned how many other clone troopers could possibly break from the Galactic Republic. Greenberg viewed the episode as "all about the brotherhood, and how far those boundaries stretch", saying that "Even the guy who turns out to be the bad guy makes the case that he was doing it for his brothers. This is about what it means to be a clone and what it means to be part of that brotherhood".

Dave Filoni, the supervising director of the series, refers to the betrayal of the Republic by a clone trooper as them having "gone Jango", saying that "they have a little too much of Jango Fett in them".

The episode went through numerous changes during production. Slick was originally planned to have red hair in the episode. However, when rendered, the dark hair model that was standard for clone troopers was used instead, helping him blend in with the rest of the clones rather than stick out as a potential suspect. The script of the episode had the opening sequence feature the clone troopers preparing a combat droid known as "The Beast", which resembled the dome-shaped mining droids from the original Star Wars film and a head of the Dalek from the British program Doctor Who. The sequence was cut from the episode, as it was decided to keep the 2 opposing sides fixed as "clones versus droids", and the scene involving "The Beast", whose function was not revealed, unnecessarily complicated the storyline.

Most of the main voice actors in the series appeared in the episode. The episode's opening was narrated by Tom Kane, while Matt Lanter voices Anakin Skywalker and James Arnold Taylor voices Obi-Wan Kenobi and the tactical droid. Nika Futterman returns as Asajj Ventress in the episode. Dee Bradley Baker voices the clone troopers in the episode, including Captain Rex and Commander Cody. Matthew Wood provided the voices of the battle droids.

"The Hidden Enemy" takes place on Christophsis, the first episode in the series to do so. The planet was previously featured in the 2008 Star Wars: The Clone Wars film. The episode is placed second chronologically in the series, after season 2, episode 16, "Cat and Mouse", and before the Star Wars: The Clone Wars film. The episode was meant to serve as a prequel to the film.

Reception
"The Hidden Enemy" originally aired on Cartoon Network on February 6, 2009 from 9:00 to 9:30 p.m. It was viewed by 2.512 million people the night it aired.

Following the episode's broadcast and home video release, it has received positive reviews from television critics.

Eric Goldman from IGN called it "another solid episode", praising its opening battle sequence, Obi-Wan Kenobi's dialogue with Asajj Ventress, and Captain Rex and Commander Cody's strategy to catch Slick, although he did note that Ventress' appearance in the episode felt "a bit unnecessary". He ultimately gave the episode a "great" rating of 8.5 out of 10.

Dan Zehr from Coffee With Kenobi commended the episode, calling the chase sequence involving Rex, Cody, and Slick "thrilling" and saying that the episode was "integral to disseminating the mystery that will eventually become Order 66". Zehr praised the anthology structure of the series, calling it "quite brilliant", and said he was even more impressed with Dave Filoni after watching the episode.

Susan Lulgjuraj from FanSided said that the episode makes the clone troopers feel like individuals, thus revealing their "dark side", and it raises moral questions about the clones' rights and freedoms.

References

External links

 
 
 "The Hidden Enemy" episode guide on StarWars.com

Star Wars: The Clone Wars (2008 TV series) episodes
2009 American television episodes